We L:ve, also known as the 2020 Pentagon Online Concert WE LIVE, is the first online live concert by South Korean boy group Pentagon. Initially, the live concert is set to be broadcast live at 3pm KST on November 29, 2020. However, a day before the event, Cube announced that the concert would be "urgently postponed", amid the COVID-19 pandemic. A rescheduled date for the concert was held on December 13.

This concert is a solo concert held by Pentagon after one year of their first world tour Prism. The members expressed their ambition, "We will present an unforgettable time to the global universe with a special stage that can only be found in this performance".

Background
On September 29, 2020, Cube released a time table for Pentagon's tenth extended play WE:TH through their official homepage and SNS, which shows the group's promotion schedule beginning October 4 until their first online concert, 2020 Pentagon Online Concert [WE L:VE]. On October 20, they released the official concert poster. In the released poster, Pentagon showed a warm atmosphere while leaning against each other against the backdrop of the Milky Way in the night sky where daisy petals flutter. The keyword 'L:VE' can be interpreted in various meanings and is expecting to show a variety of appearances to their fans. The tickets can be purchased through Interpark from November 26. We L:ves official merchandise was available; pre-sale from November 11-16 and general sale began on November 17. A series of behind-the-scene pictures, special clips and videos were posted everyday on the group's official social media accounts.

On November 28, Pentagon announced through their social media accounts that their online concert 'WE L:VE' was postponed as Yeo One and Pentagon is self-quarantine. Yeo One underwent voluntary COVID-19 testing because he was in the same location with someone who tested positive. His result was confirmed negative. Cube stated, "To prevent any unexpected circumstances, the rest of Pentagon members decided to get tested for COVID-19 and self-quarantine themselves.", and further apologized to those who have been waiting for the concert.

On December 3, Pentagon announced the rescheduled date for '2020 Pentagon Online Concert [WE L:VE]' slated for December 13 at 3pm KST.

Concert synopsis
Before the show started, a countdown timer, ticket purchase verification and concert information appeared on the homepage. Pentagon showed a colourful appearance under the four chapters under the keyword 'L:VE', which can be interpreted in various ways. After the end of the countdown, Pentagon opened the stage with intense stages such as "Basquiat", "Gorilla" and "Can You Feel It". After the songs, Pentagon took a breather to interact with their fans as they introduced themselves and greeted fans in various languages such as Japanese, Hindi, French, and German and more. The member apologized saying, "We should have had a concert two weeks ago, but I'm sorry to see you only now. It's a more confusing time than ever. I am really grateful for being able to meet you on the stage like this." Next was, "The Black Hall", a song that had been much requested by their fans for the group to perform. In Chapter II - We L:ve with Color, the group performed unit stages according to the member's personality, starting with a supercool performance by Hui and Shinwon. The duo performed their unreleased self-composed song "WTH", which was unveiled for the first time. The second unit performance was performed by Yuto and Wooseok. They presented a fun hip-hop stage wherein they performed the tracks, "Poison (독)", "Always Difficult Always Beautiful", and "Repeat:II (도돌이표)". Yanan and Hongseok presented a warm winter sensibility with Ailee's "I Will Go to You Like the First Snow". Lastly, Yeo One and Kino showcased a rendition of Taemin's "Move". On this day, Jinho, a member who enlisted in the military in May, watched the performance online and communicated in real time through comments, giving a different fun and impression. Jinho showed off his strong friendship by sending passionate support to each stage of the Pentagon. Fans also responded with comments, and held comment events such as 'I love Pentagon' and 'We are always with Pentagon'. Next, Pentagon start with a classroom skit during Chapter III - We L:ve Young, where Pentagon members introduced themselves, including member Jinho to their teacher Yeo One and their new classmate Kino. They continued to present stages with their hit songs from "Happiness" (Korean version), "Shine", "Naughty Boy" and "Spring Snow". During Chapter IV - We L:ve on Stage, the group expressed the meaning of 'stage' means to them. Hui expressed that the stage is not just his workplace but also his battlefield where he feels most pressured and where he has the most hardships and where it brings him the greatest pain. The stage is also a place that brings me the greatest happiness, as well as the greatest joy and achievements. It is a space where contradicting emotions exist". In this section, Pentagon performed never-before-seen "Paradise (별이 빛나는 이 밤)" and "You Like" as well as "Sha La La" and "Daisy". Before the final chapter We L:ve in Universe, a special video "To Universe" with words from Pentagon for their fans was displayed. Next was "Nostalgia" as an encore song where they showed the unibong choreography made by member Kino. During this stage, they were surprised by the fans from across the globe joined and sang along with them. Concluding the show, Pentagon gave fans a precious gift in the form of a track made by member Kino titled "Eternal Flame".

Set lists
This set list is representative of the show on December 13, 2020.Chapter I - We L:ve at This Moment & VCR "Basquiat"
 "Gorilla"
 "Can You Feel It"
 "The Black Hall"Chapter II - We L:ve with Colors & VCR'
 "WTH" 
 "Poison (독)" + "Always Difficult Always Beautiful" + "Repeat:II" 
 "I Will Go to You Like the First Snow" 
 "Move" 

Chapter III - We L:ve Young
 "Happiness" (Korean version)
 "Shine"
 "Naughty Boy"
 "Spring Snow"

Chapter IV - We L:ve on Stage & VCR
 "Paradise (별이 빛나는 이 밤)"
 "You Like"
 "Sha La La"
 "Daisy"

Chapter IV - We L:ve in Universe & VCR
 "To Universe" 
 "Nostalgia"
 "Eternal Flame"

Personnel
Credits are adapted from the concert's closing credits.

 Artists - Jinho, Hui, Hongseok, Shinwon , Yeo One, Yan An, Yuto, Kino, Wooseok
 Presented – Cube Entertainment
 Chairman – Kang Sungkon
 C.E.O – Ahn Woohyun, Rhee Dongkwan
 Vice Chairman – An Byunghwan
 Artist Group Executive Direct – Jeon Seunghwe
 Artist Management Director – Park Myungchul
 Management 1 Director –  Park Myungchul
 Management 1 Division - Youn Daesung, Cho Sungyoon, Shin Hongjun, So Byeongjun, Choi Yukyung, Kim Jinsu
 Management 2 Director – Hwang Byeongil
 Management 2 Division – Jung Kwanghee, Cho Seongbeon, Yun Keunsoo, Ahn Younghwan, Lee Giseong
 Management 3 Director - Nam Yujung
 Management 3 Division - Hwang Kanghoon, Jeong Cheolho, Lee Juyeong, Jo Hanseok, Kim Dohyun
 Management 4 Director – Ku Byungmoo
 Management 4 Division – Kim Chungyoung, Jung Byoungjoo, Kim Kihwan, Park Sein
 Marketing Director – Shinny's Borami
 Marketing Team 1 – Sohn Hyunseo, Hong Sujeong, Kim Seulgi,Kwon Huijeong
 Marketing Team 2 – Shin Seulki, Lee Hyeyeon, Kim Jaeyi, Seo Hyelim
 Japan Business Team – Sung Jiyoung
 Media Relations Chief Manager – Heo Jaeok
 Media Relations Chief Team – Kim Jaehyun, Kim Hyehyun, Park Jisoo
 Artist Performance Production Chief Manager – Kim Sehwan
 Artist Development Chief Manager – Song Jungeun
 Casting Team – Oh Hyejung, Jung Rakyoung, Shin Jiye
Training Team – Logan Lee, Park Byunggwan
 Global Business Chief Manager – Song Jungeun
 Global Business Team – Kim Jihyo. Lee Sunjae, Joy Yang, Ahn Sueyeon, Bak Sohui, Ling Li
 Concert/MD Team – Kim Seohyun, Shin Minhee, Ahn Daehwan
 Advertising Business Team – Kang Seungbo, Lee Cheoljae
 Visual Group Executive Director – Jang Jaehyeok
 Visual Production Team – Kim Suhan, Lee Kyeongsoon, Kang Minjun
 Content Production Team – Park Soyeon, Lee Jesus, Jang Minus, Kim Minsoo, Yun Donhee, Kim Bongfeel, Lee Chaewon, Kim Yeojin, Moon Youra, Kim Eungchan, Kim Donghung
 Art & Web Team – Je Juyeong, Ko Eunhee, Park Soomin, Lee Haena, Kang Heekyung, In Hyejin
 Artist Directing Chief Manager – Jang Yeonhwa
 Artist Directing Team – Park Jihyen, Jang Hojung
 Music Production Chief Manager – Monica Jihyun Kim
 A&R Team – Sim Soyeon, Park Sukhyung, Kim DOyee, Oh Yunji
 Music Production Team – Shin Jaebin, Seo Jaewoo, Won Jeongho, Seo Junsik, Choi Yeji
 Music Publishing Team – Kim Minjung, Seo Subin
 Corporate Communications Director – Ahn Myungkyu, Kim Eunjung
 Corporate Communications – Oh Seolhwa
 Business Management Group Executive Director – Jo Changhee
 Business Management Director – You Jisu
 Financial Accounting Team – Kim Kahee, Yun Kyungseo, Lee Hyeonju
 Personnel General Affairs Team – Lee Yongjin, Kim Giback, Yoo Younggon
 Management Strategy Director – Yoo Sungman
 Disclosure?Investor – Kim Hyojin, Dana Park
 Legal Team – Cho Onsun, Shin Jin
 VT Cube Japan Inc.
 Executive Supervor – Lee Jungsook
 Management – Ayano Tanaka, Hwang Doohwan, Akiyo Kaneko, Mami Usami
 Choreography Director – Kim Sehwan
 Choreography – Kim Myoungsup, Kim Minseong, Kim Jiyong, Kim Hyosep, Kim Hyunjin, Noh Hana, Park Ohksun, Bang Minjoo, Lee Dongha, Han Jiwon @StarSystem
 Styling – Park Yonghyun, Yu Hyeyoung, Kim Kwangsoo @NakedRoom
 Hair – Kim Taesung, Sophia @JennyHouse
 Make Up – Hanna, Yeoun Hee, Yuyuji @JennyHouse
 Photographer – @Studi5 (Lee Soojin, Seo Sehyun), @GM Pictures (Lee Sanghyuk, Heo Yeseul, Park Mimsu)
 Design – Yoo Soojin, Park Deokyeong, Hwang Jihee @Studio Th!nkers
 Concert Production
 Stage Manager – Choi Soyoung, Yoo Eunjeong, Kim Kyuseob @RWD Stage management
 Stage set – @Good Stage
 Truss System – Lee Youngchan, Ji Eunseok, Le Yongzhe, Lee Youngjae, Song Qilong, Du Huaqian, Lee Juho, Lee Gyunhwan, Lee Yonghoon, Li Junzhe, Choi Hyeonseok, Hong Wonpyo, Oh Hyemi, Lee Jinseong, Seo Younji, Lee Youngchan @ Frame Company
 Sound
 Protools – Shin Jaebin @Cube Entertainment
 Sound – Yoon Chungyeon, Park Hyeonmin, Kim Donghee, Oh Seungtaek, Seo Sungwon, Jung Eunjoo @Artmix.co
 Lighting
 Lighting Director – Moon Jihwan, Lee Yukyeong @Moonlight
 Video & LED
 Video Design & Director – Jeon Myoungkeon, Lee Sunghwan, Kim Jeonghun, Hwang Sinae, Gwak Sangyeon, Lee Gilho, Mila Cho, Choi Yoonsoo, Eugene Jeong, Park Hyeji, Kim Yeonjeong @Motion E&T 
 Organized – Live Nation, CJ ENM
 Ticket – Interpark
 Chief Production Manager – Ian Chung
 Stage Designer – Lee Eunchae
 Writer – Choi Hyejeong
 Assistant Director – Jeong Yuna
 Show Director – Kim Jangta
 Special Thanks – Universe

Notes

References

2020 concerts
K-pop concerts
Pentagon (South Korean band)
Pentagon (South Korean band) concert tours